Enis Saramati (born 19 April 1994) is a Slovenian football attacking midfielder who plays for German Bayernliga club SV Donaustauf.

References

External links
NZS profile 

1994 births
Living people
Slovenian footballers
Slovenia youth international footballers
Association football midfielders
NK Rudar Velenje players
NK Šmartno 1928 players
Slovenian PrvaLiga players
Slovenian Second League players
Bayernliga players
Slovenian expatriate footballers
Slovenian expatriate sportspeople in Germany
Expatriate footballers in Germany